Baseball in Denmark exists in Aarhus, Odense, Herning and Copenhagen. The team in Copenhagen (Urban Achievers) is still trying to get a place to play after battling the municipality of Copenhagen for a field. Urban Achievers have been shut out of three different fields due to creation of astroturf fields for soccer, but continue to fight for a place to play. Denmark has had a national baseball league (DM) since 2014. A U-21 national baseball team will be formed in 2016 at the same time that the new international standard Odense stadium, will be inaugurated.

National baseball teams in Europe
Baseball